Pervomaysky is a rural locality (a village) in Kandakovsky Selsoviet, Kiginsky District, Bashkortostan, Russia. The population was 109 as of 2010. There is 1 street.

Geography 
Pervomaysky is located 28 km north of Verkhniye Kigi (the district's administrative centre) by road. Sultanovka is the nearest rural locality.

References 

Rural localities in Kiginsky District